Pakistan competed at the 2014 Asian Games held in Incheon, South Korea between 19 September and 5 October 2014. It sent 182 athletes to compete in 23 sports. It was defending its title in hockey (men's), squash (men's team) and cricket (women's) but successfully managed to defend the women's cricket title only.

Medalists

Badminton

Men's Squad
 Muhammad Irfan Saeed Bhatti
 Umer Zeeshan

Men's singles

Men's doubles

Women's Squad
 Palwasha Bashir
 Mahoor Shahzad

Women's singles

Women's doubles

Mixed

Mixed doubles

Baseball

Men's Squad
 Muhammad Ahsan Baig
 Umair Imdad Bhatti
 Adnan Butt
 Nasir Nadeem Butt
 Atif Dar
 Muhammad Waqas Ismail
 Burhan Johar
 Khurram Raza Khan
 Tariq Nadeem
 Zubair Nawaz
 Adil Sardar
 Muhammad Abu Bakar Siddiqui
 Dur I Hussain Syed
 Fazal ur Rehman
 Muhammad Usman
 Muhammad Sumair Zawar

Preliminary
Pool A

Boxing

Pakistan Boxing Federation announced only one change to the 6 member squad which competed at the 2014 Commonwealth Games at Glasgow, UK, with Sanaullah (91 kg) added in place of Muhammad Asif (69 kg).

Men's Squad

Cricket

The PCB has decided to send the women's team only to these Games so as to give them exposure as well as defend their title. On July 16, 2014, PCB announced the following squad for the Games. Pakistan got direct entry to the knockout stage.

Women's Squad

 Sana Mir (Captain)
 Bismah Maroof (Vice Captain)
 Nain Abidi
 Sidra Nawaz (Wicket-Keeper)
 Nida Dar
 Javeria Khan
 Asmavia Iqbal
 Marina Iqbal
 Aliya Riaz
 Kainat Imtiaz
 Sumaiya Siddiqi
 Qanita Jalil
 Sania Khan
 Anam Amin
 Sadia Yousuf

Quarterfinals

Semifinals

Final

Cycling

Pakistan sent only one athlete, who will be competing in both road and track events.

Men's Squad
ammar imtiaz
 Muhammad Shakeel

Track

Road

Track

Road

Field hockey

Men's Squad

 Muhammad Imran (captain) (full back)
 Shafqat Rasool (vice captain) (forward)
 Imran Butt (goalkeeper) 
 Muhammad Irfan (full back)
 Ammad Shakeel Butt (half back)
 Muhammad Tousiq (half back)
 Fareed Ahmed (half back)
 Rashid Mehmood (half back)
 Muhammad Rizwan Jr. (half back)
 Kashif Shah (half back)
 Muhammad Waqas (forward)
 Muhammad Umar Bhutta (forward) 
 Abdul Haseem Khan (forward)
 Muhammad Dilber (forward)
 Shakeel Abbasi (forward)
 Muhammad Rizwan Sr. (forward)

Preliminary
Group B

Semifinal

Final

Football

Men's tournament

Squad
 Kaleemullah (FW) (Captain)
 Saqib Hanif (GK)
 Ahsanullah (GK)
 Muzammil Hussain (GK)
 Mohammad Ahmed (DF)
 Mohammad Sohail (DF)
 Mohammad Bilal (DF)
 Naveed Ahmed (MF)
 Mohsin Ali (DF)
 Saddam Hussain (FW)
 Ahsan Ullah (DF)
 Mehmood Khan (MF)
 Mohammad Riaz (MF)
 Sher Ali (MF)
 Mansoor Khan (FW)
 Ashfaq Uddin (MF)
 Mohammad Zeeshan (MF)

First round

Gymnastics

Men's Artistic Squad
 Muhammad Afzal
 Muhammad Yasir

Qualifying

Judo

Men's Squad
 Shah Hussain Shah

Kabaddi

Men's Squad
 Shabbir Ahmed
 Hassan Ali
 Nasir Ali
 Wajid Ali
 Muhammad Shahbaz Anwar
 Syed Aqeel Hassan
 Ibrar Hussain
 Muhammad Kashif
 Muhammad Nisar
 Muhammad Rizwan
 Wasim Sajjad
 Atif Waheed

Preliminary
Group A

Semifinals

Karate

Men's Squad

Women's Squad

Rowing

Men's Squad
 Tanveer Arif
 Muhammad Masood
 Abdul Rehman

Qualification Legend: F=Final; FA=Final A (medal); FB=Final B (non-medal); R=Repechage

Rugby

Men's Squad
 Ahmed Wasim Akram
 Muhammad Basit
 Daud Gill
 Mian Hamza Hayaud Din
 Muhammad Ghalib Javed
 Muhammad Ali Khan
 Muhammad Tahir Rafi
 Sair Riaz
 Syed Xeeshan Rizvi
 Umer Usman
 Ahmed Khalid Waqas
 Ayub Zafar

Preliminary
Group B

9th-12th Place Semifinal

11th place match

Shooting

Men's Squad

Pistol
 Kalim Khan
 Ghulam Mustafa Bashir
 Uzair Ahmed

Shotgun
 Khurram Inam
 Usman Chand
 Fakhar-ul-Islam Qureshi
 Aamer Iqbal

Rifle
 Siddique Umar
 Muhammad Ayaz Tahir
 Zeeshan Ul Shakir Farid

Women's Squad

Pistol
 Mahwish Farhan

Rifle
 Nadira Raees
 Minhal Sohail

Squash

Men's Squad
 Nasir Iqbal
 Farhan Zaman
 Danish Atlas Khan
 Farhan Mehboob

Men's singles

Men's team

Preliminary

Pool A

Women's Squad
 Maria Toorpakay Wazir
 Sammer Anjum
 Moqaddas Ashraf
 Riffat Khan

Women's singles

Women's team
Pool B

Swimming

Men's Squad
 Nisar Ahmed
 Nasir Ali
 Muhammad Asif
 Muhammad Saad

Women's Squad
 Anushe Dinyar Engineer
 Simrah Nasir
 Soha Sanjrani
 Areeba Shaikh

Table tennis

Men's Squad
 Muhammad Asim Qureshi
 Syed Saleem Abbas Kazmi
 Mohammad Rameez Khan

Men's singles

Men's doubles

Men's team
Group C

Women's Squad
 Shabnam Bilal
 Ayesha Iqbal Ansari
 Rahila Kashif

Women's singles

Women's doubles

Women's team
Group C

Mixed

Mixed doubles

Taekwondo

Men's Squad

Women's Squad

Tennis

Men's Squad
 Aqeel Khan
 Muhammad Abid

Men's singles

Men's doubles

Men's team

Women's Squad
 Ushna Suhail
 Sara Mansoor

Women's singles

Women's doubles

Women's team

Volleyball

Men's Squad
 Muhammad Ismail Khan
 Naseer Ahmed
 Nasir Khan
 Asif Nadeem
 Aimal Khan
 Syed Shujah Abbas Naqvi
 Mohib Rasool
 Imran Sultan
 Mubashir Raza
 Akhtar Ali
 Muhammad Idrees
 Murad Jehan

Preliminary
Pool B

|}

|}

Playoff
Pool H

|}

|}

9th–12th semifinals

|}

11th place match

|}

Weightlifting

Men's Squad

Wrestling

Men's Squad
 Muhammad Inam
 Bilal Hussain Awan
 Muhammad Bilal
 Muhammad Asad Butt
 Sheraz Mohammed Ahmed Khan Qasuri

Freestyle

Wushu

Men's Sanda

Women's Sanda

See also
2014 Asian Games

References

Nations at the 2014 Asian Games
2014
Asian Games